Robert Thorne (1 March 1860 – 11 February 1930) was an English first-class cricketer.

Thorne represented Hampshire in two first-class matches in 1883. Thorne made his debut against Sussex and played his second and final first-class match against the same opposition in the same season.

Thorne died in Bitterne Park, Southampton, Hampshire on 11 February 1930.

External links
Robert Thorne at Cricinfo
Robert Thorne at CricketArchive

1860 births
1930 deaths
Cricketers from Southampton
English cricketers
Hampshire cricketers